The ACM Transactions on Programming Languages and Systems (TOPLAS) is a bimonthly, open access, peer-reviewed scientific journal on the topic of programming languages published by the Association for Computing Machinery.

Background 
Published since 1979, the journal's scope includes programming language design, implementation, and semantics of programming languages, compilers and interpreters, run-time systems, storage allocation and garbage collection, and formal specification, testing, and verification of software. It is indexed in Scopus and SCImago.

The editor-in-chief is Andrew Myers (Cornell University). According to the Journal Citation Reports, the journal had a 2020 impact factor of 0.410.

References

External links 
 
 TOPLAS at ACM Digital Library
 TOPLAS at DBLP

Computer science journals
English-language journals
Publications established in 1979
Bimonthly journals
Transactions on Programming Languages and Systems